Peter Ebinger (10 October 1958 – 24 August 2015) was an Austrian equestrian. He competed in two events at the 1984 Summer Olympics.

References

External links
 

1958 births
2015 deaths
Austrian male equestrians
Austrian dressage riders
Olympic equestrians of Austria
Equestrians at the 1984 Summer Olympics
Sportspeople from Vienna